The Cuban worm lizard (Amphisbaena cubana) is a worm lizard species in the family Amphisbaenidae. It is endemic to Cuba.

References

Amphisbaena (lizard)
Reptiles described in 1879
Taxa named by Juan Gundlach
Taxa named by Wilhelm Peters
Endemic fauna of Cuba
Reptiles of Cuba